Ateef Konaté (born 4 April 2001) is a French professional footballer who plays for Oxford United on loan from Nottingham Forest, as an attacking midfielder.

Career

Le Havre
Konaté played with the Le Havre academy from the age of thirteen, before earning his first professional contract in June 2019. Between 2018 and 2020, Konaté made 32 appearances in the Championnat National 2 and Championnat National 3 for Le Havre's second team. He also appeared for the first team in November 2019, appearing as a substitute in a Coupe de France fixture against USL Dunkerque.

Nottingham Forest
On 13 September 2020, Konaté signed with Nottingham Forest, joining the club's under-23 team. He made his debut for Forest on 11 August 2021, starting in an EFL Cup fixture against Bradford City. His league debut followed on 25 January 2022 against Barnsley.

On 30 January 2023, Konaté signed on loan with EFL League One side Oxford United for the remainder of the season.

Personal
Born in France, Konaté is of Malian descent.

Career statistics

Honours
Nottingham Forest
EFL Championship play-offs: 2022

References

2001 births
Living people
French footballers
Association football midfielders
Le Havre AC players
Nottingham Forest F.C. players
Oxford United F.C. players
Championnat National 2 players
French expatriate footballers
French expatriate sportspeople in England
Expatriate footballers in England
French people of Malian descent
Sportspeople from Aubervilliers
Footballers from Seine-Saint-Denis